Bullowsee is a lake in the Mecklenburgische Seenplatte district in Mecklenburg-Vorpommern, Germany. The lake's west bank flows into a wetland, making its exact surface area difficult to estimate. Its approximate surface area is 0.16 km². 

The lake is situated within the Müritz National Park.

Lakes of Mecklenburg-Western Pomerania
LBullowsee